Ranged Marquis (originally ) was a rank of the Chinese nobility that existed from the Warring States period to the Chen dynasty.

Warring States period and Qin dynasty 
During the Warring States period, most countries abolished the feudal system(封建制) which was inherited from the Spring and Autumn period. This established the prefecture system(郡县制) with commanders (郡) and districts(县). As survivors of the feudal system, sovereigns created new titles such as Ranged Marquises(徹侯), and Lords(君) who taxed on their feeding fief(食邑). The Qin dynasty established the Twenty Ranks of Peerage Hierarchy(二十等爵制) after Shang Yang's Reform, and the Ranged Marquis was the highest rank in all twenty ranks. A Ranged Marquis is granted a feeding fief(食邑) which only he could tax on, and not a feudal fief. The fief of a Ranged Marquis is called marquisate(侯國). Different awards - large fiefs of districts(縣), small fiefs of townships(鄉), or tiny fiefs of neighbourhoods(亭) were given to marquises according to their military exploits.

Secondary Marquis(關內侯) is the second rank under Ranged Marquis in the Twenty Ranks of Peerage Hierarchy.

The Han Dynasty inherited the Ranged Marquis and all twenty ranks of peerage hierarchy come from the Qin Dynasty.

Han dynasty 
Ranged Marquis was the highest nobility title for subjects who were not from the imperial family of the Han dynasty. Its original name was 徹侯 (Chè Hóu), and was changed to 通侯 (Tōng Hóu) or 列侯 (Liè Hóu) because of the naming taboo of the Emperor Wu of Han's name, Liú Chè (劉徹). All three names have similar meanings.

Western Han dynasty 
This was the highest title a non-royal person could achieve. They would receive a golden seal with a purple ribbon (金印紫綬). The marquis's fief was called a marquisate, who was seen as a district. The number of households varied greatly among marquisates. The smaller marquisates may have had only hundreds of households. However, the larger marquisates may have more than ten-thousand households such as Marquis of Guanjun (冠軍侯) and Marquis of Changping (長平侯). A marquisate is administered by a counselor-delegate (國相 Guó Xiàng) as a magistrate (令, 長) in his district. A marquis can appoint their courtier-officers: Household Aide (家丞 Jiā Chéng), Drafter (舍人 Shè Rén), Cadet (庶子 Shù Zǐ), Grand Master of Gates (門大夫 Mén Dà Fū), Frontrider (洗马 Xiǎn Mǎ), Messenger (行人 Xíng Rén). The marquises who are not in office or marriage with an imperial princess must leave Chang'an and move to their marquisates (就國). The Commandant of the Nobles (主爵中尉) supervises marquises in Chang'an the imperial capital, and Governors (太守) of commanders supervise marquises in their fiefs.

At first, Emperor Gaozu of Han, politician in the White Horse League (白馬之盟), had said: "If one gets a marquisate without military exploits, all people must attack him." However, no one obeyed the league. While on the contrary, the Councilor (丞相), the princess' husband and the empress' father are sure to get marquisates.

Eastern Han dynasty 
There were five ranks of Ranged Marquis during the Eastern Han period. They were District Marquis (縣侯), Chief Township Marquis (都鄉侯), Township Marquis (鄉侯), Chief Neighborhood Marquis (都亭侯) and Neighborhood Marquis (亭侯). Marquises of Township or Neighborhood had courtiers but had no marquisate, only District Marquises have own marquisates as in Western Han. In normal conditions, marquisates whose owners have died without sons will be revoked by the emperor, but close relatives could inherit the title in certain conditions. Because Emperors of Eastern Han had given many lower ranged marquises liberally, there was a large gap between marquises. The ranks among ranged marquises depended on their honorary titles or the number of households in their feeding fief.

Three Kingdoms period

Cao Wei dynasty 
The early Cao Wei dynasty has accepted the nobility titles of the Eastern Han. But Sima Zhao, the King of Jin (or Prince of Jin), created Five ranks of Peerage Hierarchy (五等爵制) to replace the ranged marquis grade as the top noble titles in 264. Ranged Marquises had been preserved as lower titles for no-royal-family people, and the district marquises existed in both ranged marquises and five ranks of peerage hierarchy until the Liu Song dynasty.

Shu Han and Eastern Wu dynasties 
The hierarchy of Ranged Marquis in Shu Han and Eastern Wu was the same as that of the Eastern Han.

Jin dynasty 
The Jin dynasty inherited the noble titles of Cao Wei including the twenty ranks of peerage hierarchy and the five ranks of peerage hierarchy. During this period, ranged marquises were divided into three grades: District Marquises, Township Marquises and Neighborhood Marquises. Marquises lost marquisates but kept feeding fiefs and courtiers such as household aide (家丞 Jiā Chéng) and cadet (庶子 Shù Zǐ). The five peers rank in the first rank and the second rank respectively, while district marquises represent the third rank, township marquises as the fourth and neighborhood marquises as the fifth.

Southern Dynasties period 
The nobility system of the Liu Song dynasty is the same as that of the Jin dynasty. The Southern Qi dynasty abolished the District Marquis grade of ranged marquises. The remaining two marquis grade is the eighth rank of nobility hierarchy in the Chen dynasty. The Sui dynasty conquered Chen dynasty and abolished the last ranged marquises in 589.

References 

Chinese noble titles